Quercus ningangensis is an Asian species of trees in the beech family Fagaceae. It is native to southern China (Guangxi, Hunan, Jiangxi). It is placed in subgenus Cerris, section Cyclobalanopsis.

Quercus ningangensis is a large tree up to 30 meters tall. Leaves can be as much as 18 cm long.

References

External links
line drawing, Flora of China Illustrations vol. 4, fig. 379, drawings 8-13 at top 

ningangensis
Flora of China
Plants described in 1979